The Pioneer Valley Chinese Immersion Charter School (simplified Chinese: 先锋中英双语学校; pinyin: Xiānfēng Zhōng-Yīng Shuāngyǔ Xuéxiào), abbreviated to PVCICS, is a public Charter school in Hadley, Massachusetts. Founded in February 2007, PVCICS offers an immersion program that teaches Chinese Language Arts and culture in addition to a regular curriculum. PVCICS' goals are to graduate students with excellent scholarship, high proficiency in Mandarin Chinese and English, plus sensitivity to multiple cultures. PVCICS serves the Pioneer Valley region.

Academics 
PVCICS uses an immersion program to promote high fluency in the Chinese language. Different grade levels receive different amounts of Chinese instruction.

IB Curriculum
PVCICS is an approved International Baccalaureate school offering the International Baccalaureate Diploma Programme (IBDP) for 11th and 12th graders.

Currently, the IB courses offered include: English (literature or language and literature), Math (applications and interpretation or analysis and approaches), History, Science (Biology, Chemistry or Physics), Chinese (one of three levels), Business, Psychology, and Theatre. In addition, the IB Diploma Programme requires a Theory of Knowledge (ToK) class, an Extended Essay, and Creativity, Action and Service (CAS) hours to be completed with a non-failing grade in each for earning the Diploma.

See also
 Language/culture based charter school
 Shuang Wen School - English-Chinese K-8 school in New York City
 Mandarin Immersion Magnet School - English-Chinese K-8 school in Houston, Texas
 Cupertino Language Immersion Program - In Cupertino, California

References

External links
 
Unofficial Website*

Charter schools in Massachusetts
Schools in Hampshire County, Massachusetts
Public elementary schools in Massachusetts
Public middle schools in Massachusetts
Public high schools in Massachusetts
Chinese-language education
International Baccalaureate schools in Massachusetts